Cinestill Film (stylized as CineStill film) is a Los Angeles based selling film for analog cameras from repacked or respooled Kodak motion picture cinema film stock. The two brothers who founded the company started with hacking cameras and lenses, then moved on to selling film.

CineStill started selling film in 2012, that were bought directly from Kodak and respooled into 35mm and 120 film cartridges. This collaborative approach to manufacturing reduces cost and increases profit margin while still allowing the company to operate at a very small scale.

Color negative films 
For their color negative films, CineStill acquires Eastman Kodak motion picture cinema emulsions, allowing it to be developed with the C-41 process rather than the Eastman Color Negative process. Kodak converts the motion picture cinema film by eliminating the Remjet backing, a separate Anti-halation backing used to protect the film in motion picture cameras. Due to the removal of this anti-halation backing, CineStill Film exhibits a glowing effect on the image in areas with strong overexposure.  CineStill films can be processed in both C-41 chemistry and ECN chemistry for a lower contrast image.

800Tungsten (800T) 
CineStill’s 800Tungsten, also known as 800T, was the first color film stock that the company released. The film is a variant of Kodak’s Vision 3 5219 motion picture cinema film. It is cut and respooled into DX coded film cartridges. As a result of its high sensitivity, it is more suitable for low-light photography.

50Daylight (50D) 
CineStill’s 50Daylight, also known as 50D, is a daylight balanced (5500K) color negative film that is a variant of Kodak’s Vision3 5203 motion picture cinema film. It can be rated anywhere between EI 12-100 without the need for push processing. Similar to the 800T, 50D has its remjet layer removed which results in a slight halation effect. It is factory spooled into DX-coded cassettes.

400Dynamic (400D) 
In Spring of 2022, CineStill announced 400Dynamic, also known as 400D. 400D is a 400 speed daylight balanced film, balanced for most photographic scenario. CineStill announced their newest film via a crowdfunding campaign, reaching the goals that allowed the company to produce 400D in 35mm, 120 Medium Format, and 4x5 Large Format.

Redrum 
In October 2021, CineStill launched their limited edition Redrum film, which was available in a limited quantity. Redrum was a redscaled version of 800T. The film was only available in 120 Medium Format, which sold out within a few days.

Black and white negative film 
CineStill’s BwXX is a variant on Kodak’s Double-X 5222 film stock. It is a classic panchromatic black and white negative film.. It has a variable base ISO of 200 for tungsten lighting (3200K) and 250 under daylight (5500K). In 2021 CineStill made BwXX available in 120 Medium Format.

Film Chemistry 
To make home film processing more accessible, CineStill offers various film chemistries to process a wide range of film. Their line of film chemistries include their Df96 B&W Monobath, Cs41 Color Simplified, Cs6 Creative Slide, and Cs2 Cine Simplified. Many of their processes are available in both liquid and powder concentrates.

References

Photographic films